The Blackburn R-1 Blackburn was a 1920s British single-engine fleet spotter/reconnaissance aircraft built by Blackburn Aircraft.

History
The Blackburn was developed to meet a naval requirement (Specification 3/21) for a carrier-based reconnaissance aircraft and gun spotting aircraft. Blackburn designed a new fuselage and used the wing and tail surfaces from the Blackburn Dart. The pilot sat in an open cockpit above the engine, a navigator sat inside the fuselage and a gun position was located at the rear of the fuselage cabin. The aircraft's two-bay wings could fold for stowage aboard aircraft carriers, with the upper wing attached directly to the fuselage, which filled the interplane gap.  Armament was a single forward-firing Vickers machine gun mounted externally to the left of the pilot, with a Lewis gun on a Scarff ring for the gunner.

Three prototypes were flown during 1922, leading to an initial production contract for 12 aircraft. The production aircraft were designated Blackburn I and the first deliveries to the Fleet Air Arm at Gosport began in April 1923. 18 more Blackburn Is were built in 1923–1924. Its first operational deployment was with No. 422 Fleet Spotter Flight, which deployed aboard  in the Mediterranean in 1923.

A further order was placed for 29 Blackburns with the more powerful Napier Lion V engine, designated the Blackburn II. The upper wing was raised 22½ in (0.57 m) to improve handling. A few Blackburns were used as dual-control trainers and all the Blackburn Is were converted to II standard before the type became obsolete in 1931, when they were replaced by the Fairey IIIF.

Variants
Blackburn
 Prototype, three built.
Blackburn I
 Production version with a 449 hp (335 kW) Napier Lion IIB engines, 33 built.
Blackburn II
 Improved production version with a 464 hp (346 kW) Napier Lion V, and increased gap between wings. 29 built.

Blackburn Trainer
 Trainer version of Blackburn I, fitted with side-by-side cockpit and dual controls. Known by the Fleet Air Arm as the Bull. Two out of Blackburn I batch.

Operators
 
 Royal Navy
 Royal Air Force

Specifications (Blackburn I)

See also

References

Bibliography

 
 
 

Blackburn
1920s British military reconnaissance aircraft
Single-engined tractor aircraft
Biplanes
Aircraft first flown in 1922